Ladislav Kačáni (1 April 1931 – 5 February 2018) was a Slovak football player. He played for Czechoslovakia national team in 20 matches and scored three goals.

He was a participant at the 1954 FIFA World Cup, where he played in two matches.

Kačáni played mostly for Inter Bratislava. He later began coaching career and led Inter Bratislava and, together with Ladislav Novák, Czechoslovakia national team.

References 

  ČMFS entry

1931 births
2018 deaths
Slovak footballers
Czechoslovak footballers
1954 FIFA World Cup players
Slovak football managers
Czechoslovak football managers
Czechoslovakia international footballers
Czechoslovakia national football team managers
FK Inter Bratislava players
People from Lučenec
Sportspeople from the Banská Bystrica Region
FK Inter Bratislava managers
FC Lokomotíva Košice managers

Association football forwards